Lindbergh Beacon may refer to:

Lindbergh Beacon (Los Angeles), atop the City Hall in Los Angeles
Lindbergh Beacon atop the Palmolive Building in Chicago